John Dix or John Ross (21 September 1811 – after 1863) was a British writer and poet in Great Britain and America. An alcoholic, he wrote a noted biography of Thomas Chatterton and he wrote "In Our Own Dear Homes Again" during the American Civil War.

Biography

Dix was born in Bristol. He said that his mother was taught by Chatterton's sister - Mary Newton. Dix took to poetry writing about sites in Bristol which were published in the Bristol Mirror and later included in an anthology titled "Lays of Home". In 1832 he married Sussanah Moore whose father boiled soap at Bedminster. They started a business in Wellington in Somerset, but this soon failed. He had three children, two born in Somerset, and a son born in Bristol in 1837. The son was named William Chatterton Dix in honour of his latest publication which was a Life of Thomas Chatterton. The book contained not only a biography but many of Chatterton's poems. This book contained some of Chatterton's unpublished early work but it was said to be full of half truths and even had a now discredited portrait.

Dix quickly took classes to study medicine at the expense of his friends and obtained work as a surgeon in Monmouth just over the border in Wales. His need for alcohol meant that his medical business failed and he took again to writing poems in 1837 that were combined with engravings by Edward Villiers Rippingille to create Progress of Intemperance.

Dix served time in Cardiff Gaol for debt despite applying to the Royal Literary Fund. His claims of employment around this time included editor of the Monmouth Beacon, esquire, bodyguard and traveller.

In 1845 his biography of Chatterton was published in Boston, Massachusetts after he had worked his passage as ship's surgeon. By 1847 he was back again in London asking for money from the Royal Literary Fund and despite taking a pledge of temperance he was ill and alcoholic. Dix's writings included fantasies of his friendship with Hannah More and Robert Southey and also longer descriptions of major poets like William Wordsworth. Actually one of Dix's poems, Church Wreck had once "ill advisedly" been compared to Wordsworth.

By 1850 Dix was back in America writing books on temperance, but having abandoned his family in England and having taken the name John Ross and John Ross Dix. Dix was writing also on religious subjects. In 1860 he published The New Apostles,  an attack on the Catholic Apostolic Church.
Based on this book, he had a theological dispute with Edward Eddis, member of the Catholic Apostolic Church.

His last known location is America where in 1864 he published at least a dozen ballads that supported the Unionist cause in the Civil War.

References

English non-fiction writers
1811 births
Year of death unknown
English male non-fiction writers
Writers from Bristol